Orhej "Oka" Nikolov (born 25 May 1974) is a retired professional footballer who played as a goalkeeper. He serves as assistant coach for Los Angeles FC in Major League Soccer. He spent nineteen seasons with Eintracht Frankfurt, appearing in 413 official games over the course of 13 Bundesliga seasons. Born in Germany, he represented Macedonia at international level.

Club career
Born Erbach im Odenwald, Hessen, West Germany, Nikolov grew up in Sandbach in Hessen, starting playing football with local SG Sandbach.

Nikolov started his senior career as backup, first to Uli Stein and then Andreas Köpke. After the latter left the team in June 1996 following the team's relegation from the Bundesliga he became first-choice, losing that status in early 2002 to newly-signed Dirk Heinen; he made his debut in the top division on 9 September 1995, playing the full 90 minutes in a 3–1 home win against 1. FC Kaiserslautern.

In the following years Nikolov played in every season. In February 2007, after Pröll received a rib injury, he was reinstated by manager Friedhelm Funkel, contributing with 20 games during the team's 2006-07 season.

In January 2010, it was announced that the 35-year-old Nikolov would not renew his contract with Eintracht that was due to expire in the summer, but he eventually signed a new deal until 2012, and later until 2013. In June 2013, Eintracht revealed that the goalkeeper's contract would be cancelled, effective immediately to allow Nikolov to fulfill his lifelong dream to play in the United States.

On 19 June 2013, Nikolov signed with the Philadelphia Union of Major League Soccer. He made his first start as a Union player on 30 July 2013 in a friendly against Stoke City playing 45 minutes.

Nikolov signed with Fort Lauderdale Strikers on 19 February 2014 on a contract for the nine-game Spring season. Nikolov started and played eight matches in goal for the Strikers, posting two clean sheets. The team ended up as runners-ups.

Coaching career 
 Director of Coaching at JFC Frankfurt
 Project Director and Coach at the Eintracht Frankfurt Football Academy
 Assistant coach for the under 19 German National Team.
 Nikolov also served as Assistant Coach for the Macedonian National Team as well as a goalkeeper coach for LA Galaxy.

Nikolov joined the coaching staff of Los Angeles FC in February 2022.

International career
Nikolov chose to represent the country of his ancestors, going on to win five caps for Macedonia in four years. He made his debut in a September 1998 friendly match against Egypt but since he also possessed German citizenship he couldn't acquire a Macedonian passport and therefore was unable to play in official games under FIFA. His five appearances were in friendlies.

His final international was a match in November 2001 against Hungary.

Honours

Club
DFB-Pokal: Runner-up 2005–06

References

External links

Eintracht Frankfurt archives 
Profile at MacedonianFootball 

 

1974 births
Living people
People from Erbach im Odenwald
Sportspeople from Darmstadt (region)
German people of Macedonian descent
Footballers from Hesse
Association football goalkeepers
German footballers
Macedonian footballers
North Macedonia international footballers
SV Darmstadt 98 players
Eintracht Frankfurt players
Eintracht Frankfurt II players
Philadelphia Union players
Fort Lauderdale Strikers players
Bundesliga players
2. Bundesliga players
North American Soccer League players
Philadelphia Union non-playing staff
Association football goalkeeping coaches
LA Galaxy non-playing staff
D.C. United non-playing staff
Los Angeles FC non-playing staff
German expatriate footballers
Macedonian expatriate footballers
Macedonian expatriate sportspeople in the United States
German expatriate sportspeople in the United States
Expatriate soccer players in the United States